María Teresa Sosa Ávila (12 July 1930 – 1 October 2018) was a Guatemalan politician. She was the widow of President of Guatemala Efraín Ríos Montt and mother of Zury Ríos. She was a candidate for the Presidency for the Guatemalan Republican Front in the elections of 1995. Her candidacy was annulled by the Citizen Registry, because she could not be elected to the position under the express prohibition contained in article 186, subsection c) of the Constitution of Guatemala. She was succeeded as her party's candidate by Alfonso Portillo, who subsequently won the 1999 elections.

Sosa died at home in Guatemala City on 1 October 2018 due to natural causes, six months after the death of her husband.  She was 88.

References

1930 births
2018 deaths
First ladies of Guatemala
20th-century Guatemalan women politicians
20th-century Guatemalan politicians